is a railway station in Higashihiroshima, Hiroshima Prefecture, Japan, operated by West Japan Railway Company (JR West).

Lines
Hachihonmatsu Station is served by the Sanyō Main Line.

Layout
The station has two side platforms on ground level, with an elevated station building above the tracks and platforms.

See also
 List of railway stations in Japan

External links

  

Railway stations in Hiroshima Prefecture
Sanyō Main Line
Railway stations in Japan opened in 1895